is a Japanese long-distance runner.

In 2013, he competed in the junior men's race at the 2013 IAAF World Cross Country Championships held in Bydgoszcz, Poland. He finished in 59th place.

In 2019, he competed in the senior men's race at the 2019 IAAF World Cross Country Championships held in Aarhus, Denmark. He finished in 99th place.

References

External links 
 

Living people
1994 births
Place of birth missing (living people)
Japanese male long-distance runners
Japanese male cross country runners
Komazawa University alumni
20th-century Japanese people
21st-century Japanese people